Metropolis light transport (MLT) is a global illumination application of a variant of the Monte Carlo method called the Metropolis–Hastings algorithm to the rendering equation for generating images from detailed physical descriptions of three-dimensional scenes.

The procedure constructs paths from the eye to a light source using bidirectional path tracing, then constructs slight modifications to the path.  Some careful statistical calculation (the Metropolis algorithm) is used to compute the appropriate distribution of brightness over the image.  This procedure has the advantage, relative to bidirectional path tracing, that once a path has been found from light to eye, the algorithm can then explore nearby paths; thus difficult-to-find light paths can be explored more thoroughly with the same number of simulated photons.  In short, the algorithm generates a path and stores the path's 'nodes' in a list. It can then modify the path by adding extra nodes and creating a new light path. While creating this new path, the algorithm decides how many new 'nodes' to add and whether or not these new nodes will actually create a new path.

Metropolis light transport is an unbiased method that, in some cases (but not always), converges to a solution of the rendering equation faster than other unbiased algorithms such as path tracing or bidirectional path tracing.

Energy Redistribution Path Tracing (ERPT) uses Metropolis sampling-like mutation strategies instead of an intermediate probability distribution step.

See also
 Nicholas Metropolis  – The physicist after whom the algorithm is named
Renderers using MLT:
 Arion – A commercial unbiased renderer based on path tracing and providing an MLT sampler
 Indigo Renderer – A commercial unbiased 3D renderer that uses MLT
 Iray (external link) – An unbiased renderer that has an option for MLT
 Kerkythea – A free unbiased 3D renderer that uses MLT
 LuxRender – An open source unbiased renderer that uses MLT
 Mitsuba Renderer (web site)  A research-oriented renderer which implements several MLT variants
 Octane Render – An commercial unbiased renderer that uses MLT
 Unicorn Render (web site) – A commercial unbiased render providing MTL sampler and Caustic sampler

References

External links
 Metropolis project at Stanford
 Homepage of the Mitsuba renderer
 LuxRender - an open source render engine that supports MLT
 Kerkythea 2008 - a freeware rendering system that uses MLT
 A Practical Introduction to Metropolis Light Transport
 Unbiased physically based rendering on the GPU

Monte Carlo methods
Global illumination algorithms